The St. Clair Hospital is a historic building in the King-Lincoln Bronzeville neighborhood of Columbus, Ohio. It was listed on the National Register of Historic Places in 2001. The building was commissioned as a general hospital, built in 1911, and operated until 1940. It subsequently served as a convalescent home from 1940 to 1946.  The building became a hotel, known as the Hotel St. Clair in 1948, operating until 1976. In the early 2000s, the building was renovated for senior citizen housing.

The building is one of eight surviving sites listed in The Green Book in Columbus.

See also
 National Register of Historic Places listings in Columbus, Ohio

References

External links
 

1911 establishments in Ohio
Apartment buildings in Ohio
Colonial Revival architecture in Ohio
Defunct hotels in Ohio
Hospitals in Columbus, Ohio
National Register of Historic Places in Columbus, Ohio
Commercial buildings completed in 1899
Commercial buildings on the National Register of Historic Places in Ohio
Hotels in Columbus, Ohio
King-Lincoln Bronzeville